The 49th Pennsylvania House of Representatives District in southwest Pennsylvania has been represented by Ismail Smith-Wade-El since 2023.

District profile 
Following  2022 redistricting, the 49th District is located in Lancaster County and includes the following areas:

 Lancaster (part)
Ward 02 (part) 
Division 02 
Ward 03 
Ward 04 
Ward 06 (part)
Division 08
Ward 07 
Ward 08
Lancaster Township
Millersville

Representatives

Recent election results

References

Government of Fayette County, Pennsylvania
Government of Washington County, Pennsylvania
49

External links
District map from the United States Census Bureau
Pennsylvania House Legislative District Maps from the Pennsylvania Redistricting Commission.  
Population Data for District 49 from the Pennsylvania Redistricting Commission.